Jessica Hogg (born 12 October 1995) is a Welsh artistic gymnast.

Hogg competed in the 2010 Youth Olympics. She won a bronze medal at the 2014 Commonwealth Games in the team event. She has also won medals at the Northern European Gymnastic Championships with two silver medals in 2011 in the team and vault events and three gold medals in 2012 in the team, balance beam and floor events.

References

Living people
1995 births
Welsh female artistic gymnasts
Gymnasts at the 2014 Commonwealth Games
Commonwealth Games bronze medallists for Wales
Commonwealth Games medallists in gymnastics
Gymnasts at the 2010 Summer Youth Olympics
Medallists at the 2014 Commonwealth Games